Nasir al-Din Mahmud (or Mahmud II) was the Zengid Emir of Mosul 1219–1234. He was successor of Nur al-Din Arslan Shah II and was the last Zengid ruler of Mosul. Contemporary historians state that he was killed by the atabeg of Mosul, Badr al-Din Lu'lu', following the death of his maternal grandfather the Emir of Erbil, Muzaffar al-Din Gökböri. Lu'lu' then began to rule Mosul in his own right.

Citations

Bibliography
Patton, D. (1988) Ibn al-Sāʿi's Account of the Last of the Zangids, Zeitschrift der Deutschen, Morgenländischen Gesellschaft, Vol. 138, No. 1, pp. 148-158, Harrassowitz Verlag Stable URL: https://www.jstor.org/stable/43377738

See also
 Zengid dynasty

1234 deaths
Zengid emirs of Mosul
Year of birth unknown
13th-century monarchs in the Middle East